Ernest Township is a rural township in Dade County, in the U.S. state of Missouri. It is laid out as approximately a square, all farmland, with no organized communities currently within its boundaries and only an occasional residence. Missouri Highway 97, running south to north, runs through the township.

Ernest Township derives its name from Ernest Miller, a local postmaster.

References

Townships in Missouri
Townships in Dade County, Missouri